Wood Green Quarry & Railway Cutting is a  geological Site of Special Scientific Interest in Gloucestershire, notified in 1966.

Location and geology
The site is in the Forest of Dean and is a significant research site.

The exposed section in the Ludlow Series of the Silurian period spans the Gorstian and Ludfordian stages. The type section is that for the Upper Flaxley Beds and the Lower and Upper Blaisdon Beds.  Also visible is a continuous exposure to the Clifford's Mesne Sandstone of the Downtonian through the Longhope Beds.

The exposures shows the unconformity between the Lower Blaisdon Beds (top) and the Gorstian Upper Flaxley Beds. The site is a key stratigraphic locality for research of the Ludlow Series rocks of May Hill.

References

SSSI Source
 Natural England SSSI information on the citation
 Natural England SSSI information on the Wood Green Quarry & Railway Cutting unit

External links
 Natural England (SSSI information)

Sites of Special Scientific Interest in Gloucestershire
Sites of Special Scientific Interest notified in 1966
Forest of Dean
Quarries in Gloucestershire